This is a list of Ministers of the Environment, a senior member of the Italian government who leads the Ministry of the Ecological Transition. The list shows also the ministers that served under the same office but with other names, in fact this Ministry has changed name many times: the current title is Minister of the Environment and Energy Security.

The current office holder is Gilberto Pichetto Fratin, an member of Forza Italia, who is serving in the government of Giorgia Meloni since 22 October 2022.

List of Ministers
 Parties

Coalitions

Timeline

External links
Ministero dell'Ambiente, Official website of the Ministry of the Environment

References

Environment ministers of Italy
Environment